Sir is a respectful form of address for a man, and a formal title used in the United Kingdom for knights and baronets.

Sir, SIR or SiR may also refer to:

Places

Iran
 Sir, Iran, a city in Fars Province
 Sir, Razavi Khorasan, a village in Razavi Khorasan Province
 Sir, West Azerbaijan, a village in West Azerbaijan Province

West Bank
 Sir, Jenin, a Palestinian village in Jenin district
 Sir, Tulkarm, a Palestinian village in Tulkarm district

Others
 Sir Creek, on the border between India and Pakistan

People
 Sir (singer), American singer, songwriter, record producer
 Jaroslav Šír (born 1923), Czechoslovak former skier
 József Sir (1912-1996), Hungarian sprinter
 Sedat Sir (born 1975), Turkish-Australian former Australian Rules footballer

Entertainment 
 Sir (1993 film), a Bollywood film
 Sir (A Series of Unfortunate Events), a fictional character in A Series of Unfortunate Events
 Sir (album), by Fischerspooner
 Sir (2018 film), an Indian Hindi-language romantic drama film
 "Sir", a song by Nicki Minaj from Queen

SIR

Organizations
 Sigma Iota Rho, a collegiate honour society for international studies
 Society of Interventional Radiology, an American organization of health professionals
 Sons In Retirement (SIR), a fraternal organization of retired men

Mathematics and statistics
 Sequential Importance Resampling, in mathematics, a particle filtering algorithm
 Signal-to-interference ratio, in telecommunication, the ratio of useful signal versus co-channel interference received
 Short interest ratio, a metric signalling prevailing investors' sentiment
 SIR model, a compartmental model of the progress of an epidemic

Other uses
 SIR proteins (silent information regulator), in molecular biology
Saskatchewan International Raceway, a Saskatoon drag strip
 Security Industry Registry, a corporate service provided by the New South Wales Police Force
 Singapore Infantry Regiment, the main formation of the Singapore Army
 Sion Airport (IATA code SIR), the airport in Sion, Switzerland
 South Indian Railway, an early Indian railway company
 Staten Island Railway, rapid transit line in the borough of Staten Island, New York, United States
 Statutory Invention Registration, publication of an invention by the United States Patent and Trademark Office
 Surrey Iron Railway, a horse-drawn plateway that linked the former Surrey towns of Wandsworth and Croydon
 Serial Infrared, a category of Infrared Data Association
 Secondary Image Registration, a type of passive autofocus
 Supplemental Inflatable Restraint or airbag, a vehicle safety device

Other uses
 Sır Dam, on the Ceyhan River in Turkey
 Sirene (Sir in Serbian), a type of cheese